The 1984 U.S. Clay Court Championships (also known as the 1984 U.S. Open Clay Courts) was a men's Grand Prix and a women's Championship Series tennis tournament played on outdoor clay courts in Indianapolis in the  United States. It was the 16th edition of the tournament and was held from August 4 through August 12, 1984. Andrés Gómez and Manuela Maleeva won the singles titles.

Finals

Men's singles

 Andrés Gómez defeated  Balázs Taróczy 6–0, 7–6
 It was Gómez' 4th title of the year and the 8th of his career.

Women's singles

 Manuela Maleeva defeated  Lisa Bonder-Kreiss 6–4, 6–3
 It was Maleeva's 3rd title of the year and of her career.

Men's doubles

 Ken Flach /  Robert Seguso defeated  Heinz Gunthardt /  Balázs Taróczy 7–6, 7–5
 It was Flach's 3rd title of the year and of his career. It was Seguso's 3rd title of the year and of his career.

Women's doubles

 Beverly Mould /  Paula Smith defeated  Elise Burgin /  JoAnne Russell 6–2, 7–5
 It was Mould's 2nd title of the year and the 4th of her career. It was Smith's 2nd title of the year and the 8th of her career.

References

External links 
 ITF – Tournament details: 1984 USCC–Indianapolis
 ITF – Tournament details: 1984 U.S. Clay Courts

 
U.S. Clay Court Championships
U.S. Clay Court Championships
U.S. Clay Court Championships
U.S. Clay Court Championships